Led Zeppelin's 1971 Japanese Tour was the first in Japan by the English rock band. Commenced on 23 September and concluding on 29 September 1971, it was one of the first tours of Japan by a western rock band.

"It was the first time I'd been to such a sort of overpopulated place…" recalled guitarist Jimmy Page of Tokyo, where the tour began. "It was a city with such a new vision towards the future. The technology boom was really going on, even then… It seems odd now with Nikon everywhere, but at the time they were just really breaking the market, and you could get cameras over here really, really inexpensively, and hi-fi and little cine cameras… We came here and went away loaded with cameras and I started documenting the rest of my travels with Led Zeppelin for a bit."

One of the concerts from the short tour, at Hiroshima on 27 September, was a benefit show. As an expression of thanks, the city of Hiroshima presented the band with a letter of appreciation and the city medal from the local mayor.

During the tour, singer Robert Plant allegedly punched drummer John Bonham before one of the shows. This was not the only turbulent incident, as manager Peter Grant explained:

The concerts were recorded at the insistence of the Japanese record company Warner Bros.-Pioneer Corporation, which represented the band's record label Atlantic Records in Japan. However, Page considered the audio quality to be so poor, he decided to wipe the tapes and reuse them.

Set list
A typical set list was:

"Immigrant Song" (Page, Plant)
"Heartbreaker" (Bonham, Page, Plant)
"Since I've Been Loving You" (Page, Plant, Jones)
"Out on the Tiles" (intro) (Page, Plant, Bonham) / "Black Dog" (Page, Plant, Jones)
"Dazed and Confused" (Page)
"Stairway to Heaven" (Page, Plant)
"Celebration Day" (Jones, Page, Plant)
"Bron-Y-Aur Stomp" (Page, Plant, Jones) (Played on 23 and 28 September)
"That's the Way" (Page, Plant)
"Going to California" (Page, Plant)
"Tangerine" (Page)
"What Is and What Should Never Be" (Page, Plant)
"Moby Dick" (Page, Jones, Bonham)
"Whole Lotta Love" (Bonham, Dixon, Jones, Page, Plant)

Encores (variations of the following list):
"Thank You" (Page, Plant) (Played on 24 and 29 September)
"Communication Breakdown" (Bonham, Jones, Page)
"Rock and Roll" (Page, Plant, Jones, Bonham) (Played on 29 September)

There were some substitutions, variations, and order switches. On 24 September "Your Time Is Gonna Come" was played for the only time in a "Whole Lotta Love" medley that went something like this: "Whole Lotta Love"/"Boogie Chillen"/Cocaine Blues"/"Rave On!"/"Your Time Is Gonna Come"/"I'm A Man"/"The Hunter"/"Hello Mary Lou/"Oh, Pretty Woman"/"How Many More Times"

The only known live performance by Zeppelin of "Friends" on this tour on 29 September 1971 in Osaka, as captured on a number of bootlegs.

Tour dates

References

External links
Comprehensive archive of known concert appearances by Led Zeppelin (official website)
Led Zeppelin concert setlists
Led Zeppelin Japanese Tour Programme 1971

Sources
Lewis, Dave and Pallett, Simon (1997) Led Zeppelin: The Concert File, London: Omnibus Press. .

Led Zeppelin concert tours
1971 concert tours
1971 in Japanese music
Concert tours of Japan